Qingcheng is a district of Qingyuan, Guangdong province, China.

Qingcheng District is located in the middle of Guangdong province, lying beside the Bei Revier. The District government is located in the Fengcheng Subdistrict. There are 3 towns, 4 Subdistricts and a forest farm.

Climate

History
Qingcheng District, the predecessor of Qingyuan County, is a county with a long history of 2229 years, formed in the Qin Dynasty (221 BC).

Qingyuan County is nestled in the land south of the five ridges. The diligent, wise and hospitable Qingyuan County people have been hardworking since ancient times, creating the brilliant culture which has become part of the excellent traditional culture of the Chinese nation.

Many celebrities such as Zhang Jiuling, Su Dongpo, Yang Wanli, Han Yu, Hai Rui, etc. have adopted Qingyuan County as their hometown and this has become the pride of the residents. There are many talented people born in Qingyuan County.

In October 2018, Christopher Rex Barnhart became the first known permanent American, college-level teacher in Qingcheng District, teaching vocational and oral English at Guangdong Country Garden Polytechnic. Barnhart goes by the Chinese name 孔永逊 (Mr. Kong Yongxun). His Chinese name was created with the help of colleagues at the college and means "Kong Forever Modest." "Kong" is the surname of Confucius, one of Barnhart's inspirations.

On January 7, 1988, the State Council approved the revocation of Qingyuan County and established the Qingyuan city. Qingyuan County was divided into two county-level areas, the Qingcheng District and Qingjiao District (the Qingxin County, now Qingxin District) ; January 28, the provincial government declared that the Qingcheng of Qingyuan County, Fucheng and Zhouxin were belong to the Qingcheng District.

In April 2012, there were 4 Subdistricts, 4 towns, 77 neighborhood committees, and 71 village committees in Qingcheng District.

Administration
There are 4 Subdistricts (Fengcheng Subdistrict, Dongcheng Subdistrict, Zhouxin Subdistrict, Henghe Subdistrict), 4 towns (Yuantan, Shijiao, Longtang, and Feilaixia).

Geography

Economy
It is the transportation junction of the north of Guangzhou area and the commodity distributing center from the north to the south of Guangdong province. It was awarded as the "China Excellent Tourism City" in 2001.

Mineral resources
Qingcheng District is rich in mineral resources, such as the diverse and high-grad resource:the albite, potash feldspar, iron ore, kaolin, rare earth, etc. They make great contribution to the foundation of the local building materials industry.

Water resources

Qingcheng district is rich in shallow groundwater. Beijiang River, Dayan River and Bijia River are the main river. There are more than 20 reservoir, such as Yingzui  reservoir, Yingzhan  reservoir and Huadou  reservoir and so on.

Land resources
As for the land resources, there are about 70% of the area are plain and hilly land. It is an advantage for the building construction and large-scale industrial.

Tourism
In term of tourism, the north of the Qingcheng area is a mountainous area. Feixia mountain, Bijia mountain, Damao mountain are some of the typical interest of places.

Industry
Industry is the mainstay of the economy of the  Qingcheng district. Particularly, the light industry is developed. The pillar industry of Qingcheng District are wire and cable, ceramics, electronics, building materials, plastic and clothing industries.

Agriculture
Agriculture of Qingcheng district is quite developed. Covering a farmland area of 25.7 million km2, Qingcheng district had made great effort at the agriculture. The main produce is rice. Economic crops includes vegetables, flowers, fruits, bamboo shoots and so on. Qingyuan partridge chicken and black brown goose famous are famous at home and abroad. As a fresh agricultural production base of the pearl river delta, Qingcheng district produce a large sum of pigs and other aquatic products.

Labor force
There are about 100000 people are overseas Chinese and compatriots in Hong Kong and Macao. It is an important Overseas Chinese hometown. At present, there are about  200000 labor force. It owns a labor cost advantage in developing the labor-intensive export processing and other industries.

The real estate industry, tourism and trade circulation are becoming the pillar industries of Qingcheng district economy.

Agriculture

Qingcheng district played a role as the main provider of Guangdong province and the original Qingyuan Country. Since Qingyuan Country became the Qingyuan City in 1988, the agriculture is still the main basic industry. With the increasing percent of the area for urban and decreasing of the agriculture, the government decided to adjust the structure of the agriculture. They improve the technology and put their heart to develop the outskirt-type agriculture, planting vegetable, fruit, flowers and so on. They have turned the tradition agriculture into the commercial agricultural. Qingcheng District earned 1313milion,4,58 times compared to 1988.

Transport
It has an advantaged religion.
Beijing-Guangzhou railway, Wuhan-Guangzhou high-speed railway, Jing-Zhu Expressway, Guangzhou-Qingyuan expressway, Guangzhou-Lengchang expressway and 107 national road across Qingcheng District.

Transportation Projects are developing in Qingcheng District: Foqingcong highway, Shantou-Zhanjiang highway, Guangzhou-Qingyuan intercity railway.

Transportation in Qingcheng district is convenient. At the north of Qingcheng district, the 107 National Road runs through the whole region. It is only 28 kilometers away from the Guangzhou New International Airport. The district is on the west of the Qingfo highway and the east of Qingsan highway. The Beijiang River are available for 100 tons of ships.

railway stations
Beijing-Guangzhou railway: Yinzhan'ao railway station and Yuantan railway station
Beijing-Guangzhou high-speed railway: Qingyuan railway station
Guangzhou-Qingyuan intercity railway: Qingcheng railway station, Longtangzhen railway station, Yinzhan railway station

Language
The main language of Qingcheng district is "vernacular". Vernacular has little difference with "yueyu". Some of the speak "hehua", and the other speak kejiahua. Local people in Shijiao town, Longtang town, Yuantan town, Zhouxin, Dongcheng, Henghe, Fengcheng and Yinzhan are all speak vernacular. Some people live in Shijiao speak Kejiahua. Some local in Zhouxin speak Hehua. People speak different languages in their daily life. However, almost all of them can speak vernacular.

Travel

In order to commemorate the patriotic with Zhu Ruzhen, the last Bangyan of Qing Dynasty, Qingcheng district government built the park. There is a statue of Zhu Ruzhen and  China's excellent tourism sculpture. It shows the beauty of the classical gardens and the charm of the humanities in Qingyuan.

The Rooster rock is a famous scenic spot in Qingyuan, having a 1600-year history. Countless literati poet, singular Chester, South officials, monks, Taoist and the hiking visitors left their footprints here since a thousand years ago.such as the poetry and the exploration of anecdotes. The shape of the Rooster rock is similar to a rooster.

Huang Tengxia scenic spot, "the King of drifting", is the best natural ecological tourist area in Qingyuan in terms of the quality and quantity of water, the preserved condition of plants.

Qingyuan Earl park is a park about ecological tourism, leisure, entertainment, catering and tourism.

Qingyuan Feng cheng ecological park is a theme park about outdoor activities and sports. The radium war combat and military expansion is entertaining, enjoyable and interesting.

Food 
There are Cantonese and Hakka foods in Qingcheng District. There are many delicious food in Qingcheng District, such as Qingyuan Sliced Cold Chicken, Kowloon tofu, knife cut cake, Pork with salted vegetables and Zhouxin porridge.

References 

County-level divisions of Guangdong
Qingyuan